The Kimmeridge Clay is a sedimentary deposit of fossiliferous marine clay which is of Late Jurassic to lowermost Cretaceous age and occurs in southern and eastern England and in the North Sea. This rock formation is the major source rock for North Sea oil. The fossil fauna of the Kimmeridge Clay includes turtles, crocodiles, sauropods, plesiosaurs, pliosaurs and ichthyosaurs, as well as a number of invertebrate species.

Description 

Kimmeridge Clay is named after the village of Kimmeridge on the Dorset coast of England, where it is well exposed and forms part of the Jurassic Coast World Heritage Site. Onshore, it is of Late Jurassic (Kimmeridgian) age and outcrops across England, in a band stretching from Dorset in the south-west, north-east to North Yorkshire. Offshore, it extends into the Lower Cretaceous (Berriasian Stage) and it is found throughout the Southern, Central and Northern North Sea.

The foundations of the Humber Bridge on the southern (Barton) side of the bridge are on Kimmeridge Clay beneath superficial deposits, under the Humber estuary.

Economic importance 
Kimmeridge Clay is of great economic importance, being the major source rock for oil fields in the North Sea hydrocarbon province. It has distinctive physical properties and log responses.

Vertebrate fauna 

Fauna uncovered from the Kimmeridge Clay include:

Ray-finned fish

Lobe-finned fish

Cartilaginous fish

Turtles

Archosaurs

Thalattosuchians

Ornithischians 
Indeterminate ankylosaur osteoderms have been found in Wiltshire, England. Indeterminate stegosaurid remains have been found in Dorset and Wiltshire, England.

Saurischians 
Indeterminate ornithomimmid remains have been found in Dorset, England. An undescribed theropod genus was found in Dorset.

Pterosaurs

Plesiosaurs

Ichthyosaurs

Invertebrates 

The invertebrate fauna of the Kimmeridge Clay includes:
 Mollusca:
Cardium striatulum
 Ostrea deltoidea
Gryphaea (Exogyra) virgula
 Trigonellites
 Belemnotheutis
Etchesia
Arthropoda:
Phlyctosoma sp.
 Eryma sp.
 Magitalatimana sp.
 Mechochirus sp.
 Archaeolepas redtenbacheri

See also 
 List of dinosaur-bearing rock formations

References

Bibliography 
 Galton, P.M. 1999. Cranial anatomy of the hypsilophodontid dinosaur Bugenasaura infernalis (Ornithischia: Ornithopoda) from the Upper Cretaceous of North America. Revue Pale´obiologie, 18, 517–534.

Further reading 
 Martill, D.M., Naish, D. & Earland, S. 2006. Dinosaurs in marine strata: evidence from the British Jurassic, including a review of the allochthonous vertebrate assemblage from the marine Kimmeridge Clay Formation (Upper Jurassic) of Great Britain. In: Colectivo Arqueologico y Paleontologico Salense, (ed.) Actas de las III Jornadas Intrernacionales sobre Paleontologı´a de Dinosaurios y su Entorno, 16–17 September 2004. Salas de los Infantes, Burgos, 47–84.

Geologic formations of England
Jurassic System of Europe
Jurassic England
 
Tithonian Stage
Lower Cretaceous Series of Europe
Cretaceous England
Berriasian Stage
Shale formations
Shallow marine deposits
Source rock formations
Fossiliferous stratigraphic units of Europe
Paleontology in England
Geography of Dorset
Geology of the North Sea
Energy in Europe